Dale Cook (born November 24, 1958) is an American former kickboxer who competed in the middleweight, super middleweight, light heavyweight and cruiserweight divisions. With a background in karate and taekwondo, Cook debuted professionally in 1977 and spent the early part of his career as a full contact rules fighter, winning the PKA World Middleweight Championship. In the 1980s, he began fighting under Oriental and Muay Thai rules and took two world titles under the WKA banner. A short stint in shoot boxing towards the end of his career in the mid-1990s resulted in another world title in that discipline.

An occasional actor, Cook also starred in several action-oriented B-movies in the early 1990s.

Career
Nicknamed Apollo, Dale Cook began practicing martial arts with taekwondo at the age of fifteen and eventually earned the rank of seventh degree black belt. After taking up kickboxing, he turned professional in 1977 and rose to prominence when he won the PKA World Middleweight Championship. Having fought exclusively under the full contact rule set in the beginning of his career, he later ventured into Oriental rules in the 1980s.

He won his second world title and the first with low kicks on June 12, 1987 when he knocked out Donald Tucker in the first round to claim the WKA world middleweight (-72.5 kg/159.8 lb) title. Following this, he added the WKA super middleweight (-76 kg/167.6 lb) strap to his mantle.

During the late 1980s and early 1990s, Cook challenged six Muay Thai stylists from Thailand, defeating five of them and losing once, a second round KO at the hands of Changpuek Kiatsongrit on June 30, 1990 in Tokyo, Japan. On July 30, 1992, he fought Toshiyuki Atokawa at the Kakutogi Olympics II in Tokyo in a kickboxing/full contact karate hybrid match. Rounds one and three were fought with boxing gloves, and rounds two and four bare-knuckle with punching to the face disallowed. Cook won on points, and the pair rematched under Seido karate rules on October 4, 1992 in the opening round of the '92 Karate World Cup in Osaka, Japan. The first round was ruled a draw and went to an extension round after which Atokawa won on all five judges' scorecards.

He continued to fight in Japan where he won the shoot boxing world title before retiring in 1996.

After his retirement, Cook opened Apollo's Martial Arts karate and kickboxing gym in his hometown of Tulsa. Among his students are K-1 heavyweights Randy Blake, Todd Hays and Ralph White, as well as the Oklahoma Destroyers World Combat League team. Another notable student was 6 year old Kevin Morby. He also runs the Xtreme Fighting League, an Oklahoma-based promotion which features both kickboxing and mixed martial arts matches.

Championships and awards

Kickboxing
Professional Karate Association
PKA United States Welterweight Championship

World Shoot Boxing Association
WSBA World Championship
World Kickboxing Association
WKA World Middleweight (-72.5 kg/159.8 lb) Championship
WKA World Super Middleweight (-76 kg/167.6 lb) Championship

Boxing record

Karate record

Kickboxing record

Filmography

References

External links
 Official site
 
 

1958 births
Living people
Boxers from Oklahoma
Light-middleweight boxers
American male kickboxers
Kickboxers from Oklahoma
Middleweight kickboxers
Light heavyweight kickboxers
Cruiserweight kickboxers
American male karateka
American male taekwondo practitioners
Kickboxing trainers
Sportspeople from Tulsa, Oklahoma
American male film actors
Male actors from Oklahoma
American male boxers